The Air Force Academy (abbr. ILMASK) is located at Tikkakoski in Jyväskylä, Finland. The primary mission of the Air Force Academy is to train warfighting airmen who can carry out their missions even under most strenuous conditions. This includes conscripts and active duty personnel and special forces such as pilots, aircraft and helicopter mechanics, and air surveillance controllers. The Air Force Academy also trains conscripts for general military operations. While training is primarily geared to serve air base functions, a number of conscripts are trained for jobs in the control and reporting centres. The Air Force Academy comprises a headquarters and a Communication Systems Training Flight, Aircraft and Weapon Systems Training Flight, Reserve Non-Commissioned Officer Training School, and a Reserve Officer Training School.

Initial pilot training was formerly given in the Air Force Academy in Kauhava, but basic training was branched off as a separate unit and moved to Tikkakoski in 2005. At the same time, the Kauhava unit change its name into Training Air Wing and was later disbanded in 2014. The new unit in Tikkakoski retained the name Air Force Academy.

Logo history 

The hakaristi (swastika) is the insignia of the academy, taken into use before the Nazis incorporated the swastika as their principal symbol. While the Finnish Air Force "quietly stopped using this unit emblem" in 2020, the academy continues to use it as of September 2022.

See also 

 Valmet L-70 Vinka

References

External links 

 The Air Force Academy
The Air Force Academy for conscripts

Finnish Air Force squadrons
Finnish Air Force
Jyväskylä